Defending champion Pete Sampras defeated Yevgeny Kafelnikov in the final, 6–3, 6–2, 6–2 to win the singles tennis title at the 1997 ATP Tour World Championships. It was his fourth Tour Finals title.

Seeds

Draw

Finals

Red group
Standings are determined by: 1. number of wins; 2. number of matches; 3. in two-players-ties, head-to-head records; 4. in three-players-ties, percentage of sets won, or of games won; 5. steering-committee decision.

White group
Standings are determined by: 1. number of wins; 2. number of matches; 3. in two-players-ties, head-to-head records; 4. in three-players-ties, percentage of sets won, or of games won; 5. steering-committee decision.

See also
ATP World Tour Finals appearances

External links
Finals Draw
Round robin Draw (Red Group)
Round robin Draw (White Group)

Singles
1997 in German tennis
Tennis tournaments in Germany
Sport in Hanover